Montezuma Township is a township in Gray County, Kansas, USA.  As of the 2000 census, its population was 1,625.

Geography
According to the USGS, it contains two cemeteries: Evans and Fairview.

Wild Horse Lake is within this township.

References
 USGS Geographic Names Information System (GNIS)

External links
 US-Counties.com
 City-Data.com

Townships in Gray County, Kansas
Townships in Kansas